Drøbak-Frogn IL, DFI, is a Norwegian sports club from Drøbak. It has sections for association football, badminton, basketball, table tennis, floorball, team handball, orienteering, gymnastics, cycling, alpine skiing, and Nordic skiing.

It can trace its roots back to the club Drøbak IF, founded in 1918. In 1946 it was merged to form Drøbak-Frogn IL, together with Drøbak BK (founded 1920) and Frogn IL (founded 1934).

Football
The men's football team currently plays in the 3. divisjon, the fourth tier of Norwegian football. Seiersten stadion is their home field. Their team colors are red and white.

Drøbak/Frogn came close to being promoted to the Norwegian top division several times in the 1990s.  In 1992 the club played in the promotion play-offs, beating Strømmen IF 2–0 at home, but losing 1–2 away to Hamarkameratene in the decisive match. Drøbak/Frogn finished third in the Norwegian First Division in 1994 and 1995, and fourth in 1993 and 1996. The team was relegated from the second tier in 1997, and has since played at the third and fourth tiers of Norwegian football.

Former players include Bent Skammelsrud, Prince Efe Ehiorobo and Per Edmund Mordt.

Recent history
{|class="wikitable"
|-bgcolor="#efefef"
! Season
!
! Pos.
! Pl.
! W
! D
! L
! GS
! GA
! P
!Cup
!Notes
|-
|2004
|2. divisjon
|align=right |8
|align=right|26||align=right|7||align=right|12||align=right|7
|align=right|48||align=right|44||align=right|33
|First round
|
|-
|2005
|2. divisjon
|align=right |5
|align=right|26||align=right|13||align=right|0||align=right|13
|align=right|64||align=right|41||align=right|39
|Second round
|
|-
|2006
|2. divisjon
|align=right |6
|align=right|26||align=right|10||align=right|6||align=right|10
|align=right|59||align=right|47||align=right|36
|Second round
|
|-
|2007
|2. divisjon
|align=right |3
|align=right|26||align=right|15||align=right|3||align=right|8
|align=right|68||align=right|36||align=right|48
|Third round 
|
|-
|2008
|2. divisjon
|align=right |5
|align=right|26||align=right|12||align=right|5||align=right|9
|align=right|51||align=right|40||align=right|41
|First round
|
|-
|2009
|2. divisjon
|align=right bgcolor="#FFCCCC"| 13
|align=right|26||align=right|6||align=right|2||align=right|18
|align=right|45||align=right|64||align=right|20
|Second round
|Relegated to the 3. divisjon
|-
|2010
|3. divisjon
|align=right |3
|align=right|26||align=right|16||align=right|4||align=right|6
|align=right|77||align=right|37||align=right|51
|First round
|
|-
|2011 
|3. divisjon
|align=right |3
|align=right|24||align=right|15||align=right|3||align=right|6
|align=right|58||align=right|30||align=right|48
|First round
|
|-
|2012
|3. divisjon
|align=right bgcolor=#DDFFDD| 1
|align=right|26||align=right|20||align=right|4||align=right|2
|align=right|72||align=right|26||align=right|64
|Second qualifying round 
|Promoted to the 2. divisjon
|-
|2013
|2. divisjon
|align=right |7
|align=right|26||align=right|12||align=right|4||align=right|10
|align=right|41||align=right|47||align=right|40
|First round
|
|-
|2014
|2. divisjon
|align=right bgcolor="#FFCCCC"| 12
|align=right|26||align=right|4||align=right|3||align=right|19
|align=right|37||align=right|92||align=right|15
|First round
|Relegated to the 3. divisjon
|-
|2015
|3. divisjon
|align=right |8
|align=right|26||align=right|10||align=right| 7||align=right|9  
|align=right|57||align=right|59||align=right|37
|First qualifying round
|
|-
|2016
|3. divisjon
|align=right |5
|align=right|26||align=right|16||align=right| 3||align=right|7  
|align=right|84||align=right|33||align=right|51
|First qualifying round
|
|}

References

External links
 Official site 
 Seiersten Stadion - Nordic Stadiums

Football clubs in Norway
Sport in Akershus
Association football clubs established in 1946
1946 establishments in Norway